The Platform Initialization Specification (PI Specification) is a specification published by the Unified EFI Forum that describes the internal interfaces between different parts of computer platform firmware. This allows for more interoperability between firmware components from different sources.  This specification is normally, but not by requirement, used in conjunction with the UEFI specification.

Current version 
Platform Initialization Specification 1.7, Released January 2019.

Contents 
As of version 1.3, the PI specification contains five volumes:
 Volume 1: Pre-EFI Initialization Core Interface 
 Volume 2: Driver Execution Environment Core Interface
 Volume 3: Shared Architectural Elements
 Volume 4: System Management Mode Core Interface
 Volume 5: Standards

References

External links
UEFI Specifications and Tools
Intel Technology Journal, Volume 15, Issue 01 - "UEFI Today: Bootstrapping the Continuum"

Unified Extensible Firmware Interface